The 2019–20 MRF Challenge Formula 2000 Championship was the seventh running of the MRF Challenge Formula 2000 Championship. It began on 22 November 2019 at the Dubai Autodrome, United Arab Emirates, and finished on February 16 2020 at the Madras Motor Race Track in Chennai, India. The series was held over 15 races spanning three meetings.

Drivers
The following drivers contested the championship:

Calendar and results

Championship standings

Scoring system

Drivers' standings

MRF Challenge
MRF Challenge
MRF Challenge
MRF Challenge
MRF Challenge
MRF Challenge